This is a listing of the horses that finished in either first, second, or third place and the number of starters in the Horatius Stakes (1994–present), an American Thoroughbred Stakes race for three-year-olds at six furlongs run on dirt at Laurel Park Racecourse in Laurel, Maryland.

References

External links
 Laurel Park website

Lists of horse racing results
Laurel Park Racecourse